You Ain't Heard of Me? is the fifth album by the rapper, PSD. It was released on March 25, 2003, for Gateway Entertainment and was produced by PSD, Mac Dre, Tone Capone, Vincent Pietropaoli, Femi Ojetunde, Mike Mosley, DJ Fingahs and Lev Berlak.

Track listing
"Intro" - 0:52
"U Ain't Heard of Me" - 4:25
"Mississippi" - 4:01
"Hongry" - 3:52 (featuring Mac Dre)
"Bumpin Pie" - 3:26
"Asshole/Wholeass" - 0:38
"It's Over" - 5:01
"Pay Me" - 4:11
"Ain't Shit" - 3:50
"They Smile" - 5:36
"Getting Money" - 4:02 (featuring Yukmouth)
"Leave People Alone" - 0:44
"Naww...Yeahhh" - 4:11 (featuring B-Legit)
"Guillotine" - 3:20
"Big Thang of Coolaid" - 3:24
"What's the Method" - 3:59
"Cali Goodfellas" - 3:58 (featuring Replacement Killaz)
"Spent the Bread" - 2:48
"The Committee" - 3:34 (featuring Cut Throat Committee)
"West Block" - 3:33
"Just Livin'" - 3:24

2003 albums
PSD (rapper) albums